Karikázó is  a Hungarian folk dance traditionally performed by women. It is a circle dance in  time, traditionally to a cappella rather than instrumental music.

References

Hungarian styles of music
Hungarian dances
Circle dances